The 1984–85 St. Louis Blues season was the St. Louis Blues' 18th season in the National Hockey League (NHL).

Offseason

Regular season

Final standings

Schedule and results

Playoffs

Player statistics

Regular season
Scoring

Goaltending

Playoffs
Scoring

Goaltending

Awards and records

Transactions

Draft picks
St. Louis's draft picks at the 1984 NHL Entry Draft held at the Montreal Forum in Montreal, Quebec.

Farm teams

See also
1984–85 NHL season

References

External links

St. Louis Blues seasons
St. Louis
St. Louis
Norris Division champion seasons
St Louis
St Louis